Engenes is a small fishing village in Ibestad Municipality in Troms og Finnmark county, Norway.  It is located on the northwestern tip of the island of Andørja.  The village is home to Andørja Church, the main church for the island.

References

Ibestad
Villages in Troms